Mario Palmisano (born 28 May 1978) is an Italian rower. He competed in the men's eight event at the 2000 Summer Olympics.

References

External links
 

1978 births
Living people
Italian male rowers
Olympic rowers of Italy
Rowers at the 2000 Summer Olympics
Rowers from Naples
World Rowing Championships medalists for Italy